Arthur William "Big Boy" Crudup (August 24, 1905 – March 28, 1974) was an American Delta blues singer, songwriter and guitarist. He is best known, outside blues circles, for his songs "That's All Right" (1946), "My Baby Left Me" and "So Glad You're Mine", later recorded by Elvis Presley and other artists.

Early life
Crudup was born on August 24, 1905, in Union Grove, Forest, Mississippi, to a family of migrant workers traveling through the South and Midwest. The family returned to Mississippi in 1926, where he sang gospel music. He had lessons with a local bluesman, whose name was Papa Harvey, and later he was able to play in dance halls and cafes around Forest. Around 1940 he went to Chicago.

Musical career
He began his career as a blues singer around Clarksdale, Mississippi. As a member of the Harmonizing Four, he visited Chicago in 1939. He stayed in Chicago to work as a solo musician but barely made a living as a street singer. The record producer Lester Melrose allegedly found him while Crudup was living in a packing crate, introduced him to Hudson Whittaker, better known as Tampa Red, and signed him to a recording contract with RCA Victor's Bluebird label.

Recordings
He recorded with RCA in the late 1940s and with Ace Records, Checker Records and Trumpet Records in the early 1950s. He toured black clubs in the South, sometimes playing with Sonny Boy Williamson II and Elmore James. He also recorded under the names Elmer James and Percy Lee Crudup. His songs "Mean Old 'Frisco Blues", "Who's Been Foolin' You" and "That's All Right" were popular in the South. These and his other songs "Rock Me Mama", "So Glad You're Mine", and "My Baby Left Me" have been recorded by many artists, including Elvis Presley, Slade, Elton John and Rod Stewart.

Crudup stopped recording in the 1950s because of disputes over royalties. He said, "I realised I was making everybody rich, and here I was poor". His last Chicago session was in 1951. His 1952–54 recording sessions for Victor were held at radio station WGST, in Atlanta, Georgia. He returned to recording, for Fire Records and Delmark Records, and touring in 1965. Sometimes labeled "The Father of Rock and Roll", he accepted this title with some bemusement.

Later years

In 1968, the blues promoter Dick Waterman began fighting for Crudup's royalties and reached an agreement in which Crudup would be paid $60,000. However, Hill and Range Songs, from which he was supposed to get the royalties, refused to sign the legal papers at the last minute, because the company thought it could not lose more money in legal action. In the early 1970s, two Virginia activists, Celia Santiago and Margaret Carter, assisted Crudup in an attempt to gain royalties he felt he were due, with little success. By 1971, he had collected over $10,000 in overdue royalties through the intervention of the Songwriters Guild of America (then called the American Guild Of Authors And Composers).

On a 1970 trip to the United Kingdom, Crudup recorded "Roebuck Man" with local musicians. His last professional engagements were with Bonnie Raitt.  Recognizing his fortunes would not change, Crudup said in 1970, "I was born poor, I live poor, and I am going to die poor."

Death
Crudup died of complications of heart disease and diabetes in the Nassawadox hospital in Northampton County, Virginia, in March 1974. on March 28, 1974, four years after the failed royalty settlement.

There was some confusion about the date of death because of his use of several names, including those of his siblings.

Legacy
Crudup has been honored with a marker on the Mississippi Blues Trail, placed at Forest. Elvis Presley acknowledged Crudup's importance to rock and roll when he said, "If I had any ambition, it was to be as good as Arthur Crudup".

One of the experts who consider Crudup's "That's All Right" to be the "first rock and roll song" is Southeastern Louisiana University rock historian Joseph Burns. He adds that "this song could contain the first ever guitar solo break". Another source is equally definitive, stating that the recording "stands as a convincing front-runner for rock ‘n’ roll’s ground zero".

An 2004 article in The Guardian argues that rather than Presley's version being one of the first records of rock and roll, it was simply one of "the first white artists' interpretations of a sound already well-established by black musicians almost a decade before [...] a raucous, driving, unnamed variant of rhythm and blues".

The Blues Hall of Fame stated that Crudup "became known as 'The Father of Rock ‘n’ Roll' after Elvis Presley recorded three of his songs" but adds that "Crudup was a classic victim of music industry exploitation, and despite the commercial success of his music, was never able to even support his family from his music". The Hall quotes Presley as having said, "Down in Tupelo, Mississippi, I used to hear old Arthur Crudup bang his box the way I do now, and I said if I ever got to the place I could feel all old Arthur felt, I’d be a music man like nobody ever saw".

Discography

Solo albums
Mean Ol' Frisco (Fire, 1962)
Crudup's Mood (Delmark, 1969)
Look on Yonder's Wall (Delmark, 1969)
Roebuck Man (United Artists Records, 1970)

Collaborative albums
Sunny Road, with Jimmy Dawkins and Willie Smith (Delmark, 1969)
Arthur "BigBoy" Crudup Meets the Master Blues Bassists, with Willie Dixon and Ransom Knowling (Delmark, 1994)

Compilation albums
The Father of Rock and Roll (RCA, 1971)
Give Me a 32-30 (Crown Prince, 1982)
Star Bootlegger (Krazy Kat, 1982)
I'm in the Mood (Krazy Kat, 1983)
Crudup's Rockin' Blues (RCA, 1985)
Shout Sister Shout! (Bullwhip, 1987)
That's All Right Mama (Matchbox, 1989)
The Father of Rock and Roll (Blues Encore, 1992)
That's All Right Mama (BMG, 1992)
Complete Recorded Works, vols. 1–4 (Document, 1993)
Rock Me Mama (Orbis, 1993)
That's Alright Mama (Laserlight, 1995)
Crudup's After Hours (History, 1996)
The Complete Arthur "Big Boy" Crudup, vols. 1 and 2 (Jazz Tribune, 1997)
After Hours (Camden, 1997)
Cool Disposition (Catfish, 1999)
Dirt Road Blues (Past Perfect Silver Line, 2000)
The Essential Arthur Crudup (Document, 2001)
Blues Legends (Rainbow, 2002)
Everything's Alright (Our World, 2002)
Crudup's After Hours (Past Perfect Silver Line, 2002)
Rock Me Mama (Tomato, 2003)
The Father of Rock 'n' Roll (Wolf, 2003)
Rock Me Mamma: When the Sun Goes Down, vol. 7 (RCA, 2003)
The Story of the Blues (Archive Blues, 2004)
Too Much Competition (Passport, 2006)
Gonna Be Some Change (Rev-Ola, 2008)
My Baby Left Me: The Definitive Collection (Fantastic Voyage, 2011)
The Blues (Fuel, 2012)
Sunny Road (Delmar, 2013)

See also
Checker Records
Fire Records
First rock and roll record
Origins of rock and roll

References

External links
 Biography of Arthur Crudup
 
 
 Biography, links and song extracts
 Biographical data on Arthur Crudup
 Illustrated Arthur Crudup discography
 

1905 births
1974 deaths
Delta blues musicians
Chicago blues musicians
Electric blues musicians
American blues guitarists
American male guitarists
American blues singers
Blues musicians from Mississippi
People from Forest, Mississippi
Trumpet Records artists
Groove Records artists
RCA Victor artists
Delmark Records artists
Bluebird Records artists
Ace Records (United States) artists
Fire Records artists
Mississippi Blues Trail
Burials in Virginia
People from Northampton County, Virginia
20th-century American guitarists
Guitarists from Illinois
Guitarists from Mississippi
Deaths from diabetes
African-American guitarists
20th-century African-American male singers